Pierre Barbier (born 25 September 1997 in Beauvais) is a French professional road cyclist, who currently rides for UCI Continental Team . He is the younger brother of the cyclist Rudy Barbier.

Major results

2014
 10th Gent–Menen
2015
 10th Overall Tour de l'Abitibi
2016
 3rd Paris–Troyes
2017
 5th Grand Prix de la ville de Pérenchies
2018
 2nd Grote Prijs Jean-Pierre Monseré
 4th ZLM Tour
2019
 3rd Grand Prix de la Somme
 5th GP de Fourmies
 6th Route Adélie
 7th Grand Prix de Denain
 7th Paris–Troyes
 7th Paris–Bourges
2020
 1st Stage 3 Tour of Bulgaria
 9th Paris–Chauny
2021
 3rd Cholet-Pays de la Loire
 4th Grote Prijs Jean-Pierre Monseré
2022
 4th Grand Prix de Denain
 6th Grote Prijs Jean-Pierre Monseré
 6th Grote Prijs Marcel Kint
 8th Nokere Koerse
 9th Cholet-Pays de la Loire
 9th Kampioenschap van Vlaanderen
 10th Grand Prix d'Isbergues

References

External links

1997 births
Living people
French male cyclists
Sportspeople from Beauvais
Cyclists from Hauts-de-France
21st-century French people